Flipped Out in Singapore is the second album by the band Chainsaw Kittens, released in 1992.

Recording
Flipped Out in Singapore was produced by Butch Vig at Smart Studios in Madison, Wis. in 1992. Tyson Meade said:

Track listing
All tracks written by Tyson Todd Meade, except where noted.
"Connie I've Found the Door" (Metzger, Meade, Bell, Preston) – 4:25
"High in High School" (Metzger, Meade, Bell) – 4:00
"2nd Theme/Flipped Out in Singapore" – 3:22
"My Friend Delirium" (Metzger, Meade, Bell, Preston, McBay) – 2:29
"She Gets" (Metzger, Meade, Bell, McBay) – 2:33
"Never to Be Found" – 4:09
"Shannon's Fellini Movie" (Metzger, Meade, Bell) – 4:38
"When You Shoot" – 4:03
"Hold" (Metzger, Meade, Bell) – 3:43
"Ezekial Walks Through Sodom and Gomorrah" – 3:34
"Angels Self Destruct" – 4:56

Personnel
Tyson Todd Meade – vocals
Mark Metzger – guitar
Trent Bell – guitar
Clint McBay – bass
Aaron Preston – drums

Credits
Produced by Butch Vig
Executive Producers: Jay Faires and Steve Balcom
Recorded at Smart Studios, Madison, WI
Engineered by Butch Vig and Doug Colson
Mastered at Masterdisk by Howie Weinberg
Backing vocals on "Flipped Out in Singapore" by Asa Miura

Videos
The album's two lead tracks, "Connie, I've Found the Door" and "High in High School," saw release as music videos, directed by Phil Harder and Spike Jonze, respectively.

References

External links
 Video: Connie I've Found the Door 1992
 Video: High in High School 1993

1992 albums
Chainsaw Kittens albums
Mammoth Records albums
Albums produced by Butch Vig